Tipton St Johns railway station is a closed railway station that served the village of Tipton St John in Devon, England. It was opened in 1874 and later served as the junction for the Budleigh Salterton Railway, but was closed to passengers in 1967 due to the Beeching Axe.

History

The station originally had two platforms either side of a passing loop, there was one siding with a head shunt to the west, extending behind the station building.

The station was renamed Tipton St Johns on 2 January 1881. Additional sidings either side of the running line were provided, there was a signal box and a footbridge linking the platforms.

A camping coach was positioned here by the Southern Region from 1954 to 1964, and probably for some of the summers from 1948 to 1953. From 1961 a Pullman camping coach was here.

The station closed to passengers on 6 March 1967 and freight services were withdrawn from the line on 8 May 1967.

Present state
The station building and platform remain as private accommodation known as station house.

References

Disused railway stations in Devon
Railway stations in Great Britain opened in 1874
Railway stations in Great Britain closed in 1967
Former London and South Western Railway stations
Beeching closures in England